Seun Ajayi  is a Nigerian actor, voice over artist and master of ceremonies. He is a native of Ijebu Ibefun, Ogun State, Nigeria. He is known for his role in the television series Hustle. Ajayi was born on 31 March in Kaduna, the Northern part of Nigeria and is the last child among five children. His family moved to Lagos when he was nine years old. His father is a retired civil servant and his mother is a business woman. He had his primary and secondary education in Lagos and his tertiary education in the University of Lagos where he graduated with a bachelor's degree in Theatre Arts.

Life and career
Ajayi has received multiple nominations at the Africa Movie Academy Awards (AMAA) and the Africa Magic Viewer’s Choice Award for Best Supporting Actor in a Movie and Best Actor in an Original Comedy Series, respectively.

With over 136 hours of Pan-African screen time to his credit as the  lead character on Africa Magic’s TV sitcom Hustle, Ajayi's talent has also graced the big screen on major film projects including Ojukokoro: Greed, God Calling, The Ghost and the House of Truth, and 93 Days. Other screen credits include The Maze, Gidi Culture, Have a Nice Day, Crimson and Gidi Up.

Ajayi has lent his voice to many brand campaigns, documentaries, and film trailers, working with brands like; Uber, Keystone bank, First Bank, The Guardian, Ndani Communications, Total, Olam, Temple Productions, Telemundo, and DSTV among others.

Personal life
Ajayi married Damilola Oluwabiyi on 9 September 2017. A video of Ajayi excitedly dancing after unveiling his wife at their wedding went viral. In January 2019, he and his wife had their first child together, a boy.

Filmography

Film 

 Ojukokoro (Greed) (2016, as Monday)
 Suru L'ere (2016, as Arinze)
 Black Val (2016)
God Calling (TBA)
93 Days
The Ghost and The House of Truth
The Lost Okoroshi
Ije Awele

Short film 

 Erased (2016)
 Stuck (2019)
 Closed

Television 

 Hustle (as Dayo)
 Gidi Up (as Wole)
The Smart Money Woman
Becoming Abi

Web series 

 Crimson (as Akin)

Awards and nominations
 
Seun Ajayi has been nominated for awards like:

 The Future awards Africa prize for acting,
 Best actor in a supporting role at Africa Movie Academy Award 
 Best Actor in a comedy series at the Africa Magic Viewer's Choice Awards
 Revelation of the year at City People Movie Award.

See also
 List of Nigerian actors

References

External links
 

Nigerian male voice actors
Nigerian male film actors
Nigerian male television actors
University of Lagos alumni
Yoruba male actors
Male actors in Yoruba cinema
People from Ogun State
Male actors from Lagos
Actors from Ogun State
21st-century Nigerian actors